The Speaking Proficiency English Assessment Kit (SPEAK) is an oral test developed by the Educational Testing Service (ETS).  The SPEAK test continues to be administered to non-native English speakers, though it is no longer supported by ETS. No new versions of this test exist. The test aims to evaluate the examinee's proficiency in spoken English; however, most academic institutions recognize that it is limited in that capacity, and have therefore abandoned using it.  It is usually taken as a professional certification, especially for graduate teaching assistants in the American college and university system, who are often required to hold office hours and converse in English with students.  It is also used in the medical profession, where communication with patients is required. The SPEAK test has been routinely criticized for not accurately testing how a speaker will perform in the real world, in part because it is administered by recording the individual speaking into a recording device rather than speaking to a person. The SPEAK test has also been criticized for using native speaker norms to judge non-native speakers. In fact, independent audits of the SPEAK test conducted in 2012 on some of the few institutions found to still administer this test revealed that the assessment standards provided by ETS were not even being used by the assessors. In fact, in some cases, the assessors of the test were not trained in any way to conduct the assessments, and were found to be assigning arbitrary grades to the candidates. Some of the raters audited were found to themselves have limited functional spoken grammar.

The SPEAK test is no longer offered at most academic institutions. However, some institutions still recognize the SPEAK test for enrollment in certain degree programs where the proficiency of an individual's spoken English is deemed to be the priority.

The SPEAK test is very similar to the Test of Spoken English (TSE) and is in fact a form of the TSE developed for institutions by using retired forms of the TSE.

The SPEAK test is no longer supported by ETS. There are no new versions of this test being produced. In fact, there may only be a few versions of the test still in existence. Therefore, academic institutions and other agencies that would recognize this test as a valid assessment of an individual's capabilities in spoken English should be aware that this test highly susceptible to fraud. Versions of the test that may still be in use by academic institutions administering this test are compromised, and it is highly likely that people with results from this test have had the opportunity to take exactly the same test multiple times.

ETS developed the four skills (listening, reading, speaking and writing) TOEFL iBT test. The Speaking section of the TOEFL is not available separately from the other sections, but institutions wishing to test speaking skills only may want to use the TOEIC ( of English for International Communication) Speaking Test, also developed by ETS and available as a stand-alone assessment.

References

External links
 ETS website
 University of Kansas Medical Center (KUMC) frequently-asked questions list about the SPEAK test

English language tests
Standardized tests in the United States